Wari Umaña (Aymara wari vicuña, umaña drink, to give to drink, "vicuña watering place", Hispanicized spelling Huari Umaña) is a  mountain in the Cordillera Real in the Andes of Bolivia. It lies in the La Paz Department, Los Andes Province, Batallas Municipality. Wari Umaña is situated at the Chachakumani River, north of the mountain Jach'a Juqhu.

See also
 Chachakumani
 List of mountains in the Andes

References 

Mountains of La Paz Department (Bolivia)